Ballyliffin Golf Club is a golf club located in Ballyliffin, County Donegal, Ireland.

History
The club, founded in 1947, hosted the 1998 Ladies Irish Open.

It most notably hosted the Dubai Duty Free Irish Open in 2018.

The course record was 67, set by Jean-François Lucquin in 2002, before Rory McIlroy shot a 66 in 2006. The course record was eventually broken again in the 2018 Dubai Duty Free Irish Open where Erik van Rooyen, Andy Sullivan and Jorge Campillo all carded rounds of 65 to share the honour of owning the course record on the Glashedy Links.

Scorecards
Glashedy Links – Championship tees

Old Links – Championship tees

See also
 Royal Portrush Golf Club
 Portstewart Golf Club

References

External links

Facebook page

Golf clubs and courses in the Republic of Ireland
Golf in Ulster
Sports venues in County Donegal
Tourist attractions in County Donegal
Irish Open (golf) venues
1947 establishments in Ireland
Sports venues completed in 1947
Sports clubs in County Donegal